Joss Lynam (born as James Perry O’Flaherty Lynam; 29 June 1924 – 9 January 2011) was an Irish civil engineer who was well known as a mountaineer, hillwalker, orienteer, writer and sports administrator. He was one of Ireland's most influential figures in outdoor activities.

Early life
Lynam was born in London to Irish parents Edward and Martha (née Perry). Lynam and his older sister; Biddy, were both raised in London where his father worked as curator of maps in the British Museum. This is where Lynam was first introduced to orienteering and cartography. The family would frequently return to the West coast of Ireland to holiday because the parents were Galway natives. Here, Lynam found his love for mountaineering, and climbed his first mountain - Knocknarea, County Sligo - with his aunt.

At 18, Lynam joined the British army and trained as an officer. He was deployed to India in 1944 under the Corps of Royal Engineers where he spent the remainder of World War II. While there, he participated in his first, of many, Himalayan expeditions, climbing Kolahoi Peak. When Lynam returned in 1947, he immediately moved to Dublin and enrolled in Trinity College Dublin, after encouragement from his parents, where he began to study engineering. Lynam graduated and received his degree with Upper Second Class (2.1) Honours.

Biography
Lynam was a civil engineer by profession but devoted most of his life developing the sport of mountaineering in Ireland. He climbed extensively in Ireland, Britain, the Alps and in India. He was leader, or deputy leader, of expeditions to Greenland, the Andes, Kashmir, Tien Shan, Garhwal, Tibet and India, including the 1987 expedition to Changtse, that was the forerunner to the successful first Irish ascent of Everest in 1993.

With his involvement in developing adventure sport in Ireland he was active in promoting access and developing waymarked trails. He was involved in the creation and administration of the Federation of Mountaineering Clubs of Ireland (now Mountaineering Ireland), the Association for Adventure Sports, Bord Oiliúint Sléibhte (Irish Mountain Training Board), Tiglin (National Outdoor Training Centre [now defunct]), Outdoor Education Ireland, and Cospóir (now the Irish Sports Council) and the National Waymarked Ways Advisory Committee ( part of the Irish Sports Council).

He was a founder member of the Irish Mountaineering Club, IMC, serving as president from 1982 to 1984. and he was also a founder member of both the Irish Orienteers and Three Rock Orienteering club. He was president of the Union Internationale des Associations d'Alpinisme's expeditions commission in the 1990s.

He wrote and edited many guide books to walking and climbing in Ireland. He helped create and was editor of The Mountain Log (the journal of Mountaineering Ireland).

Family life 
Joss Lynams met his future wife Nora Gorevan when she joined the IMC, the mountaineering club founded by Joss and Bill Perott in 1948. The couple got married on his graduation in 1951. Nora was the first women to join this club.

During their marriage Joss and Nora had two daughters, Ruth and Clodagh. They also had a son Nicholas who died in 1987. Joss is survived by his two daughters and three grandsons, Chris, Ruairi and Conor. Nora died in Bray on 6 November 2019, and was buried in the family plot at Shanganagh Cemetery alongside Joss and son Nicholas (Nick).

Joss's father, Edward, was a map curator and author of numerous books about maps and map-making. Joss’s parents loved the outdoors, and there were frequent family outings to destinations such as Connemara. His sister, Biddy, died aged 76, just missing her 75th birthday in 2013.

Career 
Joss Lynam, otherwise known formally as James Perry O’Flaherty, had multiple careers. A military career, a engineering career and a mountaineering career that was the contribution he is best known for.

At just eighteen, Lynam arrived in India in order to carry out military service. However, Joss described his time there as “quiet”.

In 1948, upon arriving back to Ireland, he began to study engineering at Trinity College Dublin. During his time there, Lynam and a friend, Bill Perrott, founded the Irish Mountaineering Club. One of Lynam’s main priorities was for the club to be open to both men and women. This feministic approach served Lynam well as one of the first female members of the club would be his soon to be wife. Lynam led to the club's first expedition to the Alps after just eight months of its founding.

Being an engineer allowed Lynam to travel to regions of quite mountainous terrain, beginning a crossover in two of his biggest passions, engineering and hill-walking. He was an expert in drystone construction and took his civil engineering job very seriously. One of Lynam’s biggest projects was at the Skellig Michael heritage site in County Kerry, in South-West Ireland, where Joss was the project engineer.

Lynam had completed major expeditions such as the Alps and Mount Kolahoi before solely focusing on his engineering career. However, he described his mountaineering skills as self-taught and is unsure of how he actually survived.

He was involved in the Irish Sports Council for 10 years, giving suggestions for outdoor activities being managed by Vocational Education Committees in Ireland. His volunteering work was recognized in 2005 after he received the Irish Sport’s Council inaugural Sport Volunteer of the Year award.

He also re-analysed mountains in Connemara in 1988, after realizing that Ordnance Survey maps of the area were inaccurate.

In 1983, he became redundant but remained positive as if gave him time to focus on his love of mountaineering.

In 1991, Lynam and British climber Mike Banks were joint leaders in a veteran mountaineering trip to Jaonli peak in India, where an earthquake struck nearby within the proximity of only 15 km. In 1993, Lynam aided the foundation to the successful first Irish ascent of Everest from his previous leadership of the 1987 expedition to Changtse. Lynam led his sixth expedition in 1987 to the Himalayan Peak, Changtse at 7,500m at 67 years old, while also recovering from a coronary by-pass.

Later life and death 

In 2001, Lynam was awarded an honorary degree from Trinity College Dublin in acknowledgment of his volunteer work and remarkable achievements. Lynam celebrated his 80th birthday by climbing the Paradise Lost Route and then went onto abseil down Winder's Slab for his 82nd birthday, both routes in Dalkey Quarry. Both climbs were to raise funds for cancer research, as Lynam had been undergoing chemotherapy for Hodgkin's Disease. As a result of a short illness, which was being treated at St. Vincent’s University Hospital Dublin, Lynam died on 9 January 2011, aged 86.  Lynam’s funeral was held in the Church of St. Therésè, Mount Merrion, Dublin and then continued to Mount Jerome Crematorium.

Lynam was a highly respected figure for his achievements and contributions he made to the mountaineering community in Ireland and after his death, many paid public tributes to him. Among them was Éamon Ó Cuív, who was the former Minister for Community, Rural and Gaeltacht Affairs, named Lynam the ‘Laoch ar lár’ which translates to ‘fallen hero’. After his death, his two daughters, Clodagh and Ruth, donated his papers to his alma mater, Trinity College Dublin.  These papers cover a vast range of topics such as his life and career, family, childhood, experience of war, his involvement with different mountaineering clubs, and his many writings.  The collection also contains photos and slides that Lynam captured himself of landscapes and mountaineering, and consists of maps that were collected by Lynam and his father. There is so much material in the collection that it will take a year for the collection to be catalogued by an archivist.

Lynam’s ashes were scattered by his two daughters, Ruth and Clodagh, over the Knocknarea Mountain, Sligo on the 12 February 2011, being the first mountain he climbed. The Lynam Lecture was introduced in 2011 by Mountaineering Ireland, in his memory and his achievements in climbing, hillwalking and mountaineering in Ireland and around the world. Every December the Lynam Lecture is held by leading national and international mountaineers and discusses the development and future of mountaineering in Ireland. Past speakers include Ines Papert, Frank Nugent and Paddy O'Leary.

Legacy 
Irish climber and chair of the Irish Upland Forum, Frank Nugent, referred to Joss Lynam as "one of the most significant people in Irish mountaineering" and that Lynam was also "... one of the few Irish climbers to be known internationally". His international reach in his mountaineering inspiration to other climbers was as a result of his sheer passion and involvement in a variety of different mountaineering groups. His expertise and inspiration are seen from him being the founding member of the Irish Mountaineering Club in 1948. Joss Lynam had a significant impact on mountaineering through this Club with Bill Perrot as he ensured the club was of a mixed group and allowed for anyone to join, which was somewhat unorthodox at this time as many English and international clubs were male only.

Lynam played a key role in the development for adventure sports in Ireland, and was a chairperson of the Association for Adventure Sports. Lynam was also the initiator in helping create the network of waymarked trails across Ireland, being chair of the National Waymarked Ways Advisory Committee (1984-2007), which extended over 2,000 miles on more than 30 routes.

Lynam’s involvement continued throughout various committees and organisations, as well as clubs, where he participated in Cospóir, the national Sports council (1974-1984). In 1990s, Lynam shared his experience internationally in his role as president of the Union Internationale des Associations d’Alpinisme’s (UIAA) expeditions commission. Within this role he allowed for countries such as Pakistan, India, and Nepal in mountaineering “space” after years of being overlooked  and also represented Ireland in a special council meeting within the union.

Lynam was a monumental figure in Irish mountaineering, both as a national and international body as Dawson Stelfox, the first Irishman to conquer Everest described him as "The voice of Irish mountaineering on the international stage".

Lynam’s influence both locally and nationally are seen throughout his short books and guides which introduced many to the hills and trails of Ireland, such as Irish Peaks (1982), and Leisure Walks Near Dublin (2004). His legacy lives on through his many handwritten and edited books, one especially being Best Irish Walks, which was first published in 1994, and known as the most useful guide available. His mapping skills are seen in his elaborate guide, The mountains of Connemara (1988). Lynam also edited Irish Mountain Log for over 25 years and later made some contributions to the journal.

Lynam’s name is seen as historic in mountaineering as his name and list of peaks are preserved in an authoritative list of Irish summits over 600m, and are known as Vandeleur-Lynams because of Lynam’s issue of the first version of Irish mountains over 2,000 feet in 1952. His legacy continues to live on through quotes in many publications, such as the author of A guide to Ireland’s mountain summits, regarding Lynam as a "...major authority in Irish hillwalking and his views will continue to be important for many years", published in 2013.

References

External links
Irish Times obituary

1924 births
2011 deaths
Irish mountain climbers
Irish rock climbers